The Jefferson Standard Building is a 374 ft (114m) skyscraper in Greensboro, North Carolina. It was completed in 1923 as the headquarters for Jefferson Standard Life Insurance Co. (now known as Lincoln Financial Group) and has 18 floors. Until it was superseded by the Nissen Building in Winston-Salem in 1927, it was the tallest building in North Carolina (succeeding the Independence Building in Charlotte) and the tallest building between Washington, D.C. and Atlanta, Georgia. It was named to the National Register of Historic Places in 1976.

A 20-story addition first known as the Jefferson-Pilot Building and later the Lincoln Financial Building was finished in 1990.

History
Julian Price, president of Jefferson Standard Life Insurance, asked New York City architect Charles C. Hartmann to design his company's new headquarters. Price paid for the building in full because he did not believe in debt. The Jefferson Standard Building copied the Equitable Building in its use of a U-shape allowing more light and air into more of the building. The exterior is terra cotta and granite. Architectural styles include Neo-Gothic, Neo-Classical and Art Deco. The terra cotta tile facade incorporates Beaux-Arts and Romanesque characteristics. Above the doorway is a bust of Thomas Jefferson, for whom the company was named, with Buffalo nickels on either side of ground floor windows to represent thrift and economy. The corridors used "23 carloads of marble".

In 1930, Jefferson Standard gained a controlling interest in Pilot Life Insurance Co. In 1967, Pilot Life Insurance Co. and Jefferson Standard became Jefferson-Pilot Corporation, and 800 Pilot Life employees moved from the Pilot Life buildings, which were built in Sedgefield, North Carolina in the 1920s, into the Jefferson Standard Building and its 20-story addition in 1990.

Jefferson-Pilot merged with Lincoln Financial Group in 2006. The buildings remain the headquarters for the company's life insurance operations, though the company headquarters moved to Philadelphia.

In October 2009, a limited edition cover of Acme Comics G-Man Cape Crisis #2 showed the 1990 Lincoln Financial insurance division headquarters (formerly the Jefferson-Pilot Building), with G-Man fighting the Acme Bat. Chris Giarusso drew the cover, which recalled Superman fighting Spider-Man in 1976. A special appearance by Giarusso at the Greensboro Acme Comics store marked the cover's release on October 24. Also present were Gregg Schigiel (whose work includes SpongeBob SquarePants), Jacob Chabot (Mighty Skullboy Army), Brian Smith (Stuff of Legend) and Art Baltazar (Tiny Titans).

Lincoln Financial Building

A 20-story addition to the Jefferson Standard Building, officially known as the Lincoln Financial Building, opened in 1990. Originally known as the Jefferson-Pilot Building, the 384,993 ft² building was designed by the architectural firm Smallwood, Reynolds, Stewart, Stewart and constructed by the Hardin Construction Group. The Lincoln Financial Building, which is the tallest building in Greensboro, was constructed in a Gothic Revival architecture style to match the existing Jefferson Standard Building, a rarity for buildings constructed at the end of the 20th century.

References

External links
Photo of Jefferson-Pilot building
Close-up photos of details

Office buildings on the National Register of Historic Places in North Carolina
Skyscrapers in Greensboro, North Carolina
Skyscraper office buildings in North Carolina
National Register of Historic Places in Guilford County, North Carolina
Office buildings completed in 1923